Fynes is a given name. Notable people with the name include:

Fynes Moryson (or Morison) (1566–1630), travelled in the 1590s on the European continent and the eastern Mediterranean lands
Henry Fynes Clinton (1781–1852), English classical scholar and chronologist, born in Gamston, Nottinghamshire
Savatheda Fynes (born 1974), track and field sprint athlete, competing internationally for Bahamas

See also
Fiennes
Fyne (disambiguation)